is a women's volleyball team based in Sakata, Yamagata, Japan. It plays in V.League Division 2. The club was founded in 2015, and the owner of the team is Shinichi Tamagami of the Prestige International. Prestige also runs basketball and handball teams in Akita and Toyama. Their home arena is Kokutai Gymnasium in Sakata.

Aranmare is a coined word combining arancia and mare ("orange and sea" in Italian).

History
 2015 - Founded as Prestige International Aranmare Volleyball Club
2016-17 - Aya Sato won the scoring leader of the league.
 2018 - Promoted to V.League Women Division 2
2018-19 - Aranmare placed 4th

League results
Official Record

V・challenge 2

V.LEAGUE

Current squad
2020-21 Squad as of 19 August - 2020
 Head coach:  Tsutomu Kitahara (北原勉)

{|class="wikitable sortable" style="font-size:100%; text-align:center;"
|-
!style=background:#eb553c;"|
!style="width:13em;  background:#eb553c;"|
!style="width:7em;  background:#eb553c;""|
!style="width:14em;  background:#eb553c;""|
!style="width:8em;  background:#eb553c;""|
!style="width:7em;  background:#eb553c;""|
!style="width:7em;  background:#eb553c;""|
|-
|align=center|1
|align=left| Kaho Kitamura
|align=center|Outside Hitter/Libero
|align=right|
|align=left|
|align=center|Kanagawa
|align=center|Kaho
|-
|align=center|3
|align=left| Yuri Kimura
|align=center|Outside Hitter
|align=right|
|align=left|
|align=center|Tokyo
|align=center|Yuri
|-
|align=center|7
|align=left| Kaho Kusajima
|align=center|Outside Hitter
|align=right|
|align=left|
|align=center|Toyama
|align=center|Saku
|-
|align=center|8
|align=left| Megumi Tamura
|align=center|Setter
|align=right|
|align=left|
|align=center|Saitama
|align=center|Megu
|-
|align=center|10
|align=left| Shiiko Yanagisawa
|align=center|Middle Blocker
|align=right|
|align=left|
|align=center|Tokyo
|align=center|Shiiko
|-
|align=center|11
|align=left| Sumiko Mori (C)
|align=center|Libero
|align=right|
|align=left|
|align=center|Kagoshima
|align=center|Sumiko
|-
|align=center|12
|align=left| Riho Enomoto
|align=center|Outside Hitter
|align=right|
|align=left|
|align=center|Kanagawa
|align=center|Kei
|-
|align=center|14
|align=left| Ruka Hosoda
|align=center|Libero
|align=right|
|align=left|
|align=center|Nagano
|align=center|Ruka
|-
|align=center|15
|align=left| Hikaru Nagino
|align=center|Setter
|align=right|
|align=left|
|align=center|Chiba
|align=center|Nagi
|-
|align=center|16
|align=left| Natsuki Miyamoto
|align=center|Opposite
|align=right|
|align=left|
|align=center|Kanagawa
|align=center|Natsuki
|-
|align=center|17
|align=left| Maya Ito
|align=center|Middle Blocker
|align=right|
|align=left|
|align=center|Miyagi
|align=center|Maya
|-
|align=center|19
|align=left| Rina Sugawara
|align=center|Middle Blocker
|align=right|
|align=left|
|align=center|Akita
|align=center|Rina
|-
|align=center|20
|align=left| Haruki Koizumi
|align=center|Outside Hitter
|align=right|
|align=left|
|align=center|Saitama
|align=center|Haruki
|-

Former players
Nozomi Asakawa
Yuki Egawa Transfer to Ligare Sendai (ja)
Mariko Fujiwara
Yuri Fukuda
Yuki Honma
Serena Ito
Yukiko Matsuo
Miyu Misawa
Kasumi Nakada
Juri Sakurai
Aya Sato (volleyball)
Chisaki Sato
Nashika Sato
Tsubura Satō
Mizuki Tanno
Sayaka Toda

Arenas and practice facilities
Sakata City Kokutaikinen Gymnasium
Komagihara Park Gymnasium
Yamagata Prefectural General Sports Park Gymnasium
The team mostly practice at the small arena of Kokutai Gymnasium.

Gallery

See also
Prestige International Aranmare Akita
Prestige International Aranmare Toyama

References

External links
  Official Website

Japanese volleyball teams
Sports teams in Yamagata Prefecture
Volleyball clubs established in 2015
Sakata, Yamagata